Jason Joseph Dunkerley (born August 21, 1977, in Newtownards, Northern Ireland) is a Canadian Paralympian athlete competing mainly in category T11 and T12 middle-distance events.

Career

He competed in the 2000 Summer Paralympics in Sydney, Australia, where he won a silver medal in the T11 men's 1500 metres event and went out in the first round of the T12 men's 800 metres event. At the 2004 Summer Paralympics in Athens, Greece, he won a silver medal in the men's 1500 metres - T11 event and went out in the first round of the men's 800 metres - T12 event. At the 2008 Summer Paralympics in Beijing, China, he won a bronze medal in the men's 1500 metres - T11 event and went out in the first round of the men's 800 metres - T12 event. At the 2012 Summer Paralympics in London, United Kingdom, he won a bronze medal in the men's 1500 metres - T11 and a silver medal in the men's 5000 metres - T11.

Personal life
Jason Dunkerley was born in Newtownards, Northern Ireland with Leber's congenital amaurosis, a rare inherited eye disease that appears at birth or in the first few months of life, and affects around 1 in 80,000 of the population. He has two brothers, Jonathan and Chris, who both inherited the same eye condition. After emigrating to Hamilton from Northern Ireland with his family in 1991, he attended the W. Ross Macdonald School for Students who are Visually Impaired, Blind and Deafblind, where students were encouraged to get involved in sports. He graduated from the University of Guelph with a degree in International Development. Jason's brother Jonathan represented Canada in the 2008 and 2012 Paralympics in the sprint events.

References

External links
 

1977 births
Living people
Northern Ireland emigrants to Canada
Paralympic track and field athletes of Canada
People from Newtownards
Athletes from Ottawa
Athletes (track and field) at the 2000 Summer Paralympics
Athletes (track and field) at the 2004 Summer Paralympics
Athletes (track and field) at the 2008 Summer Paralympics
Paralympic silver medalists for Canada
Paralympic bronze medalists for Canada
Canadian male middle-distance runners
Athletes (track and field) at the 2012 Summer Paralympics
Medalists at the 2000 Summer Paralympics
Medalists at the 2004 Summer Paralympics
Medalists at the 2008 Summer Paralympics
Medalists at the 2012 Summer Paralympics
Paralympic medalists in athletics (track and field)
Medalists at the 2007 Parapan American Games
Medalists at the 2011 Parapan American Games
Medalists at the 2015 Parapan American Games
Visually impaired middle-distance runners
Paralympic middle-distance runners